Journey to the West is a Chinese television series adapted from the 16th-century novel of the same title. Production for the 66 episodes long series started on 12 September 2009, and it was first broadcast in mainland China on 28 July 2011 on TVS. The series was produced by Zhang Jizhong and was released a year later than another television series of the same title (broadcast on Zhejiang Satellite TV), but with a different cast and crew.

Cast

Main cast
 Wu Yue as Sun Wukong
 Nie Yuan as Tang Sanzang
 Zang Jinsheng as Zhu Bajie
 Elvis Tsui as Sha Wujing
 Qian Yongchen as White Dragon Horse

Other cast
 Note: Some cast members played multiple roles.

 Ma Jingwu as Subhuti
 Zhang Jizhong as Taishang Laojun
 Wei Zi as Jade Emperor
 Wang Huichun as Buddha
 Liu Tao as Guanyin (holding a willow branch)
 Liang Li as Guanyin (holding a fish basket)
 Stephanie Hsiao as Thousand Armed Guanyin
 TAE as Avalokiteśvara (Guanyin's male form)
 Yang Xiaolin as Guanyin's female form
 Tong Chun-chung as Emperor Taizong of Tang
 Feng Shaofeng as Erlang Shen
 He Zhuoyan as Golden Nosed Albino Rat Spirit
 Chen Zhihui as Bull Demon King
 Hu Ke as Princess Iron Fan
 Yan Danchen as Baihuaxiu
 You Yong as King of Baoxiang
 Shu Chang as Ruler of Women's Kingdom
 He Jiayi as Royal Advisor of Women's Kingdom
 Ady An as White Bone Demon
Zhang Meng as Lady of Wansheng Palace
 Jessey Meng as Black Spider Demon
 Ma Li as Queen Mother of the West
 Yang Niansheng as Wei Zheng / Taibai Jinxing
 Zhao Yi as Li Jing
 Yang Guang as Chang'e
 Ma Ruihao, Ma Ruihan as Nezha
 Zhao Lixin as Immortal Zhenyuan
 Lu Xiaotian as Qingfeng
 Liu Zenghui as Mingyue
 Su Gang, Zhu Pengcheng, Li Zhonghua as Fu Lu Shou
 Hong Zilin as Mao Nü
 Miao Ya Ning as Red Boy
 Qin Ziyue as Jade Faced Vixen
 Cheng Haofeng as Yellow Robe Demon
 Wu Wenjun as Yellow Robe Demon's son
 Sun Yufan as Yellow Robe Demon's daughter
 Zhao Wenqi as Scorpion Demon
 Zhang Hengping as Evil priest, Guzhi Gong, Dragon King of the South Sea, Long Armed Ape Monkey
 Hu'erxide as Queen of Wuji
 Zhang Chunzhong as Abbot of Baolin Monastery, Yellow Wind Demon
 Hou Yueqiu as Immortal of Antelope Power
 Li Tai as Nine Headed Bug
 Su An as Almond Immortal
 Li Qiang as Naked Demon
 Zhao Qiang as King of the Southern Hill, Fire Tiger of Tail, Gao Cai, Meticulous Devil
 Xi Xianfeng as King of Heat Protection
 Pan Yanfei as Blue Spider Demon
 Huang Yiwen as Purple Spider Demon
 Lin Ketong as Yellow Spider Demon
 Wang Yirong as Orange Spider Demon
 Zhang Lisha as Red Spider Demon
 Chen Jinjin as Blue Dress Fairy
 Liu Jing as Purple Dress Fairy
 Wang Xinzi as Queen of Biqiu (White Faced Vixen)
 Gu Xuan as Fake Princess of India (Jade Rabbit)
 Jing Gangshan as Manjusri
 Ma Lun as Barefoot Immortal
 Li Yuan as Virūḍhaka, Golden Dragon of Neck
 Sheng Yang as Dhṛtarāṣṭra
 Fu Yunzhao as Vaiśravaṇa
 Jia Zongchao as Virūpākṣa
 Shi Lei as Golden Furnace Boy
 Sun Xinyu as Silver Furnace Boy
 Ma Zijun as Reverend Wuchao, Wansheng Dragon King
 Wang Jianguo as Dragon King of the East Sea, Sai Tai Sui, old monk
 Zhou Xiaobin as Dragon King of the West Sea, Hundred Eyed Demon Lord (Centipede Demon)
 Jia Shitou as Grand Saint of Nine Spirits (Nine Headed Lion), Juling Shen
 Li Dan as Duke of Thunder
 Zhang Chunyan as Mother of Lightning
 Wang Lele as Granny of Wind
 Yuan Li as Cloud Pushing Boy
 Mu Jianrong as Wood Dragon of Horn
 Lian Yuxuan as Fire Tiger of Tail
 Su Mao as Lingji Bodhisattva
 Xiaomao as King of Spiritual Touch
 Qi Daji as Spotted Fish
 Pengcuo Zhaxi as Abbot of Zhenhai Monastery
 Wu Wenyu as Boy from Biqiu
 Chen Shaping as Squire Gao, Mountain Deity
 Mo Xiaofeng as Gao Cuilan
 Yin Pingzhi, Zhang Xueying, Wu Yajing as Gao family maids
 Ma Yuxi as Tang imperial consort
 Li Shuang, Zhang Shen as Earth Deities
 Qu Dalei as one of the Six Saints of Mount Mei
 Liu Bing as Witty Bug
 Gao Zhao as White Guard of Impermanence
 Hu Shaolong as Black Guard of Impermanence
 Bian Qiuwei, Han Biao, Song Lifeng, Zhu Qingmin as strongmen in Peach Garden
 Yu Zhenhuan as Red Bottomed Horse Monkey
 Chen Manzi as Water Star
 Zhao Guixiang as Zhang Daoling
 Bai Hailong as Wood Star
 Ji Xiaolong as Gentleman of Mist
 Wang Xiaoming as Hui'an
 Song Songlin as Samantabhadra
 Xu Hongzhou as Ksitigarbha
 Gao Yuanfeng as Ananda
 Wang Ruihong as Lishan Laomu
 Huang Xingbei as Six Eared Macaque
 Bahatiya'er Aizezi as King of Jisai
 Zhou Gang as Maitreya
 Alipu Aitanmu as King of Zhuzi
 Liu Zhengliang as Immortal Ziyang
 Wu Yanshu as Pilanpo Bodhisattva
 Shi Hengliang as Sun Rooster of Hairy Head
 Yibulayimu Paha'erding as King of Biqiu
 Shadike Shata'er as Royal father-in-law of Biqiu (White Deer Spirit)
 Yasheng Maimaiti as King of Miefa
 Gulibaha'er Abudureheman as Queen of Miefa
 Ayiguzhali Abuduwayiti as Royal consort of Miefa
 Gulijiamali Maimaitiniyazi as Widow Zhao
 Nijiati Niyazi as King of India
 Reyihanguli Keranmu as Queen of India
 Kalibinu'er Keyimu as Princess of India

Music
The lyrics of the opening theme song, performed by Yang Xiaolin, are taken from the mantra of the Buddhist scripture Heart Sutra. The ending theme song, sung by Dao Lang, is a remixed version of the 1986 television series Journey to the West's theme song, which was originally performed by Jiang Dawei.

See also
 Journey to the West (2010 TV series)
 List of media adaptations of Journey to the West

References

Heading west with Journey to the West

External links
 Journey to the West on Sina.com

 

Television shows based on Journey to the West
2011 Chinese television series debuts
2011 Chinese television series endings
Television about fairies and sprites
Demons in television
Television series set in the Tang dynasty
Guangdong Television original programming
Dragon Television original programming
Television series by Ciwen Media